Armadillidium nasatum is a large, Western European-based species of woodlouse that has been introduced to North America, along with Armadillidium vulgare also found in other parts of Europe.

Description 

Armadillidium nasatum can reach lengths of up to 21 millimetres. Though similar in outwards appearance to Armadillidium vulgare in dark grey color, the main distinguishing feature is pale longitudinal stripes spanning from head to rear and rectangular-like protrusion towards the apex of the head. Like Armadillidium depressum, it does not form a complete ball when enrolled. The tail has a rounded tip with incurved sides, as opposed to most genus Armadillidium species which have a flat tail.

Distribution 
Armadillidium nasatum occurs in patches in southern England, with concentrated areas in its range and sporadic occurrences in Ireland. It lives in dryer areas than most woodlice, is synanthropic, and is frequently found in non-inhabited areas such as railway lines and industrial waste ground. Like other woodlice, it is found under stones and wood.

Subspecies 
There are five recognized subspecies in the species Armadillidium nasatum:

 Armadillidium nasatum flava Colinge, 1989
 Armadillidium nasatum mehelyi Verhoeff, 1930
 Armadillidium nasatum nasatum Budde-Lund, 1885
 Armadillidium nasatum nigrescens Collinge, 1918
 Armadillidium nasatum saidovni Arcangeli, 1950

References

External links 
 

Woodlice of Europe
Crustaceans described in 1885
Woodlice